Louis Rizick Dominic is a South Sudanese politician. He has served as County Commissioner of Raga County, Western Bahr el Ghazal since 18 May 2010.

References

Living people
County Commissioners of South Sudan
People from Western Bahr el Ghazal
Year of birth missing (living people)
Place of birth missing (living people)
21st-century South Sudanese politicians